Planorbarius metidjensis is a freshwater lung snail. 

Experiments confirmed it to be a host of the Schistosoma parasites, while the Bulinus truncatus freshwater snail has been known much longer as a carrier of schistosomiasis.

Description 
The snail measures 8 mm x 16 to 18 mm. The shell is light yellowish, while the periostracum is brown, reddish or greenish. The body is nearly black with a grey foot and tentacles.

Schistosomiasis transmission 
While P. metidjensis has been successfully infected with Schistosoma haematobium in the laboratory, in Morocco, no free-living infected snails have been found during a survey. Likewise, in the laboratory, snail specimens from Portugal and Salamanca were found to be very susceptible to infections by Schistosoma bovis strains gathered from the Salamanca region, but the 1977 study urged a prevalence survey of free-living snails.

In some areas, there are S. haematobium/S. bovis hybrids. P. metidjensis is immune to experimental infection with hybrid parasites collected in Corsica that contain 23% genetical material from S. bovis.

Distribution and habitat 

The snail occurs in southwestern Morocco as well as in Algarve (Portugal) and Salamanca (Spain).

In a 2007 study carried out in Morocco, the snail was found in larger altitudes, and not in man-made water bodies like canals and artificial lakes. It tolerated a wide range of electrical conductivities (120 to 3650 microsieverts/cm) and up to 1.1 grams of chlorides per liter. It was often found together with Ancylus fluviatilis river snails.

References 

 Brown D.S. (1994). Freshwater snails of Africa and their medical importance, 2nd edition. London: Taylor and Francis, 607 p.
page(s): 217, fig. 101c

External links
 Forbes, E. (1838). On the land and freshwater mollusca of Algiers and Bougia. The Annals and Magazine of Natural History, 2 (10): 250-255, pl. 11-12
 Graells, M.P. (1846). Catalogo de los moluscos terrestres y de agua dulce observados en España, y descripción y notas de algunas especies nuevas o poco conocidas del mismo país. Viuda é Hijos de Don Antonia Calleja, Madrid, and Calleja, Ojea y Compañia, Lima. vii + 23 pp., 1 pl.
 Image of Planorbarius metidjensis

Heterobranchia
Freshwater snails
Gastropods of Europe
Gastropods described in 1838
Taxa named by Edward Forbes